Dual Alibi is a 1947 British drama film directed by Alfred Travers and starring Herbert Lom, Phyllis Dixey and Terence De Marney. It is a film noir. It was made by British National Films at Elstree Studios.

Synopsis
A top French acrobatic act, the de Lisle twins, are hired by a British promoter to perform in his Blackpool show. While they are working there one of the twins falls in love with a cigarette girl and aspiring singer named Penny. After the twins win the French lottery she steals their ticket, with the help of a spivish publicity agent, and goes to Paris to claim the prize. The twins follow them to seek revenge.

Cast
 Herbert Lom as Jules de Lisle / Georges de Lisle 
 Phyllis Dixey as Penny aka Gloria Gregg 
 Terence De Marney as Mike Bergen 
 Ronald Frankau as Vincent Barney 
 Abraham Sofaer as French Judge 
 Eugene Deckers as French Ringmaster 
 The Cromwell Brothers as Trapeze Act 
 Ben Williams as Charlie 
 Clarence Wright as M. Mangan 
 Beryl Measor as Gwen 
 Harold Berens as Ali 
 Sebastian Cabot as Loterie Nationale Official 
 Andreas Malandrinos as French Judge 
 Marcel Poncin as French Lawyer 
 Wallas Eaton as Court Official 
 Gerald Rex as Call Boy 
 Margaret Withers as Blackpool Landlady  
 H.G. Guinle
 Leonard Sharp
 Ernst Ulman   
 Eric Mason   
 Griffiths Moss   
 Gerald Conway

References

Bibliography
 Murphy, Robert. The British Cinema Book. British Film Institute, 2001.
 Spicer, Andrew. Historical Dictionary of Film Noir. Scarecrow Press, 2010.

External links
 

1947 films
1947 drama films
British drama films
Films directed by Alfred Travers
British black-and-white films
Films shot at British National Studios
Films set in Paris
Films set in Blackpool
Films about twin brothers
1940s English-language films
1940s British films